Trazié Thomas Zai (born 1 July 1999) is an Ivorian professional footballer who plays as a midfielder for Israeli Premier League club Beitar Jerusalem.

Club career
Thomas began his career with RC Abidjan in Ivory Coast. In September 2020, he signed for Nice in France before joining Lausanne-Sport on loan for the 2020–21 season. He made his professional debut with the club in a 4–0 Swiss Super League loss to Zürich on 6 December 2020. At the end of the season, Lausanne-Sport signed Thomas on a permanent basis.

International career
Thomas represented the Ivory Coast U20s at the 2017 Toulon Tournament.

References

External links
 
 SFL Profile

1999 births
Living people
People from Divo, Ivory Coast
Ivorian footballers
Ivory Coast under-20 international footballers
OGC Nice players
FC Lausanne-Sport players
Beitar Jerusalem F.C. players
Ligue 1 (Ivory Coast) players
Swiss Super League players
Israeli Premier League players
Association football midfielders
Ivorian expatriate footballers
Expatriate footballers in France
Expatriate footballers in Switzerland
Expatriate footballers in Israel
Ivorian expatriate sportspeople in France
Ivorian expatriate sportspeople in Switzerland
Ivorian expatriate sportspeople in Israel